Saga Prefectural Taku Senior High School (佐賀県立多久高等学校) is located in Taku City, Saga Prefecture, Japan. Taku H.S. is a co-educational secondary school.

History

Curriculum 
Taku High School offers its students an integrated course. Courses include:
Natural Science
Cultural Science
Human Welfare
Commerce
Multimedia
Industrial Technology

Sport 
 Taku is the only school in Saga Prefecture with a Sumo team; The school has the only climbing wall in Saga Prefecture

Clubs

Alumni

Location 
The school is located beside Route 203, which is part of the Japanese National Highway system.

By car: Taku Senior High School is located just off route 203 in Taku City. If coming from the Nagasaki Expressway, get off at the Taku I.C. and turn left. Drive for about 2 minutes and you will come to route 203. Turn right and drive a further 2 minutes and you can see the school on the right side of the road.

By train: Take the Karatsu Line either from Karatsu Station or Kubota Station. Get off at Naka-Taku Station (JR中多久駅) in Taku City. From the station, walk straight ahead to route 203, turn left and cross the road via the overpass. Then take your first right and walk 2 minutes to the school. Walking from the station take about 15 minutes.

Address : Kosamurai 23, Kitataku-machi, Taku-shi, Saga-ken, Japan 846-0002

See also
List of high schools in Japan

External links
Taku Senior High School

High schools in Saga Prefecture
Schools in Saga Prefecture
Educational institutions established in 1963
1963 establishments in Japan